Eupithecia sinicaria is a moth in the family Geometridae. It is found in China (Tibet, Shaanxi, Yunnan) and Myanmar.

References

Moths described in 1897
sinicaria
Moths of Asia